Greenshirts are generic-looking soldiers from the G.I. Joe toy line and animated series.

History
The Greenshirts are the equivalent of "extras" in that they are in the story to serve merely as background characters and have little to no speaking parts, effectively making them the Joes' equivalent of Cobra Vipers. Due to the unique look of each G.I. Joe member, it became a problem for Sunbow animators to render the G.I. Joe Team, especially for all-out battle scenes. The solution was to create generic G.I. Joe soldiers. This also addressed a problem not brought up in the comics: Cobra would outnumber the Joes.

The appearance of the Greenshirts is based upon the G.I. Joe team member Grunt, the G.I. Joe Team's infantry squad leader.

Devil's Due comics
The name "Greenshirts" came to use within canon with the release of new G.I. Joe comics from Devil's Due Productions. In this continuity, the Greenshirts were soldiers used as support troops for the main G.I. Joe team. The Greenshirts were broken into three different types, infantry, navy and air force. Some of them have been given personalities and play slightly bigger roles, even gaining Joe code-names and more prominent roles.

Greenshirts are introduced in the second issue of the series. Some are introduced by name. There is Tony Beuke, F.B.I. agent. Shipwreck meets Chief Petty Officer David Adcox. Paige Adams shows off her shooting skills. Crawford defeats Gung-Ho in a sparring session. Greenshirts and veteran Joes are sent on a ground assault on the Florida Everglades Dreadnoks base. Many die, including one who sacrifices himself to save Stalker from a H.I.S.S. tank.

Several Greenshirts are featured in issue #4 of the 'Real American Hero' series. They are part of a combined military force defending the White House from advancing Cobra forces. Many Greenshirts die in the battle, though Cobra suffers more losses and are forced to retreat.

One Greenshirt in particular is featured in issue #9. When Storm Shadow infiltrates a Joe facility in an attempt to slay General Hawk, he ultimately takes a Greenshirt and Beach Head hostage. The Greenshirt tells the other Joes to 'do what they have to do' but is ordered to be silent. Storm Shadow literally throws him around, then uses his uniform as a double-distraction escape. General Hawk, Beachhead and the Greenshirt survive.

Five Greenshirts play a prominent role in the Devil's Due G.I. Joe issue #17. Flashbacks show general training for the recruits, with special focus on Corporal Eddie Shrote. At first they think it will just be a repeat of boot camp, which all have gone through before. They soon learn it is much more, as G.I. Joe basic training involves live fire. Beachhead takes them on a dangerous mission deep into a hostile city. The team learns to work together to accomplish their goals, up to and including disobeying direct orders. Many Greenshirts get half-satirical code names throughout their training, but Beachhead's squad gets simple numbers.

Joe agent Chuckles, after his faked death, is sent to a Joe safehouse near Sudell, Louisiana. It is manned by four Greenshirts. Zandar and The Baroness attack; all four Greenshirts are slain.

Four greenshirts, Lowe, Ward, Smith and Rosen, are riding with a Joe escorting Serpentor clones when the man himself attacks. All four Greenshirts, along with the computer expert Daemon, are slain. Multiple greenshirts are assigned as part of the task force to take out Serpentor on Cobra Island. Harrison, a pilot, almost kills Serpentor by aiming a malfunctioning plane at him.

Barrel Roll
In issue #28, four Greenshirts graduate to official G.I. Joe status: Sgt. Nick Landon becomes "Depth Charge", Sgt. Paige Adams gains the code name "Mayday", David Adcox becomes "Mariner", and Lt. Dwight Stall is now Barrel Roll. Barrel Roll was then the focus of the next few issues, when he infiltrates Cobra Island to steal data. He even gains the admiration of the Crimson Twins for his business sense. Regardless, the twins still attempt to kill him, but he escapes the island. He also strikes up a friendship with the new Joe recruit, former Oktober Guard member Daina Janack.

Later, the status of Greenshirts changes. New recruits will be trained at various military bases, without yet knowing that the G.I. Joe Team exists. Those Greenshirts that do know of the G.I. Joe Team will be upgraded to "cadet" status.

Animated series

Sunbow
Greenshirts first appear in the Sunbow G.I. Joe: A Real American Hero mini-series titled "The Revenge of Cobra". They are shown in the episode "The Vines of Evil" helping the Joes successfully defend Washington D.C. against the Weather Dominator. Later episodes show Greenshirts being used as guards for the "Hydro Master" fragment. They also appear in The Pyramid of Darkness mini-series as support staff for the G.I. Joe team.

Live action film
In G.I. Joe: The Rise of Cobra, elements of the Greenshirts were used in the generic G.I. Joe soldiers that were in The Pit.

Toys
Hasbro for many years avoided producing a Greenshirt figure, as several members of the designing and writing teams didn't want to have "nameless" G.I. Joe figures for various reasons. This was circumvented with the 2005 "Infantry Team" figure six-pack, which featured six figures designed to look like the cartoon's Greenshirts. Each figure was given a separate filecard with a blank file name and codename for the buyer to fill in their own details, in essence making them "named" characters. Two of these are darker-skinned men.

In the UK equivalent of the toy line, produced by Palitoy and known as Action Force, the Grunt action figure was re-designated as a generic infantryman, available as a mail-in promotion in 1985-6. These characters also appeared in the contemporary Battle Action Force comic. It is not clear whether there was any direct connection between this and the "Greenshirts" of the American cartoon. After Hasbro and Marvel took over the Action Force brand in 1987, the generic "infantryman" figure was discontinued from the toyline.

In 2008, as part of Hasbro's 25th Anniversary G.I. Joe line, a 5-figure boxed set was released featuring Cobra villain Firefly opposed by four generic G.I. Joe troopers.

In 2011, the Steel Brigade, a term used from 1987 to 1992 for a special mail-in offer of a G.I. Joe figure with a personalized Filecard, was re-released in the Greenshirts' role. They are available as the standard trooper, and the "Steel Brigade Delta", a vehicle driver included with the V.A.M.P. MK-II.

References

G.I. Joe soldiers
Television characters introduced in 1984